Edmund Różycki (born January 13, 1827 in Volhynia, died May 23, 1893 in Kraków) was a Polish general in the January Uprising, and the overall commander of the uprising in Volhynia and Podolia. He was also an officer in the Tsarist army.

He was notable for being called "Bat’ko" (Ukrainian for father) by his troops, and marching into battle singing Ukrainian songs.

References

1827 births
1893 deaths